See Amenemhat, for other individuals with this name.

Sekhemkare Amenemhat V was an Egyptian pharaoh of the 13th Dynasty during the Second Intermediate Period. According to Egyptologists Kim Ryholt and Darrell Baker, he was the 4th king of the dynasty, reigning from 1796 BC until 1793 BC. The identity of Amenemhat V is debated by a minority of Egyptologists, as he could be the same person as Sekhemkare Amenemhat Sonbef, the second ruler of the 13th Dynasty.

Attestations
Amenemhat V is attested on column 7, line 7 of the Turin canon, which credits him with a reign of three to four years. This may be confirmed by a papyrus from Lahun which mentions a year three, some months and days of a king Sekhemkare, which could either be Amenemhat V or Sonbef.

In addition, Amenemhat V is attested by a single artefact contemporaneous with his lifetime, a statue of him from Elephantine, originally set up in the Temple of Satet and inscribed with the following dedication:

The head and arms of the statue were discovered in the 19th century in the ruins of a temple built to honor a nomarch named Heqaib and are in Kunsthistorisches Museum in Vienna. The body of the statue bearing the above inscription was discovered in the year 1932 and is now in the Aswan Museum.

Identity
There is a debate between Egyptologists as whether Sekhemkare Amenemhat V is the same king as Sekhemkare Sonbef, whom Kim Ryholt, Jürgen von Beckerath and Darrell Baker see as the 2nd ruler of the 13th Dynasty. Indeed, Sonbef called himself "Amenemhat Sonbef", which Ryholt argues must be understood as "Amenemhat [Sa] Sonbef", The Son of Amenemhat Sonbef, i.e. Sonbef would be the son of Amenemhat IV. 
In particular, they see Sonbef and Amenemhat V as two different rulers. Ryholt and Baker further posit that Sonbef's and Amenemhat's rules were separated by the ephemeral reign of Nerikare, while von Beckerath believes it was Sekhemre Khutawy Pantjeny who reigned between the two. At the opposite Detlef Franke and Stephen Quirke believe that the "Amenemhat" in Sonbef's title is part of his name and identifies him as Amenemhat V, thus seeing the two kings as one and the same person. In other terms, Franke and others regard "Amenemhat Sonbef" as a double name. Indeed double naming was common in Egypt and especially in the late 12th and 13th Dynasty.

See also

List of Pharaohs

References

18th-century BC Pharaohs
Pharaohs of the Thirteenth Dynasty of Egypt